Síle Burns (born 1985 in Cork) is a camogie player and a physiotherapist, winner of All Ireland camogie medals in 2008, when she scored two goals in the final, and 2009 and a camogie All Star award winner in 2008.

Family background
She is the daughter of former Cork Senior hurler Denis Burns, who won All-Ireland medals.

Career
Síle is the holder of All-Ireland Minor, Intermediate and Senior medals as well as Sciath na Scoil honours. She won a Senior county championship medal with divisional side Muskerry in 2007 and captured a Junior championship title with her club. She scored two late points to earn a dramatic draw for Cork in the 2010 All Ireland semi-final.

References

External links 
 Official camogie website
 Denise Cronin’s championship diary in On The Ball official camogie magazine
 https://web.archive.org/web/20091228032101/http://www.rte.ie/sport/gaa/championship/gaa_fixtures_camogie_oduffycup.html Fixtures and results] for the 2009 O'Duffy Cup
 All-Ireland Senior Camogie Championship: Roll of Honour
 Video highlights of 2009 championship Part One and part two
 Video Highlights of 2009 All Ireland Senior Final
 Reports of 2008 All Ireland final in which Síle Burns scored two goals Irish Examiner, Irish Independent, Irish Times and Reaction in Irish Examiner
 Report of 2009 All Ireland final in Irish Times Independent and Examiner

1985 births
Living people
Cork camogie players